Eikerapen Roots Festival is traditional music festival held in Eikerapen, Åseral, Norway. It has been running since August 2004. The 2014 festival is scheduled to run from 30 July to 3 August.

References

External links
http://www.eikerapen.com

Music festivals in Norway
Culture in Agder
Tourist attractions in Agder
Åseral
Folk festivals in Norway